Camelimonas fluminis is a Gram-negative, aerobic, short rod-shaped and non-spore-forming bacteria from the genus of Camelimonas which has been isolated from water from the Hanjiang River in Wuhan in China. Camelimonas fluminis has the ability to degrade cyhalothrin.

References

External links
Type strain of Camelimonas fluminis at BacDive -  the Bacterial Diversity Metadatabase

Hyphomicrobiales
Bacteria described in 2015